Bitterwater Creek, formerly Arroyo de Amargosa (Bitter Creek), is a stream with its source just southwest of the southern extreme of the Elkhorn Hills, just west of and inside the San Luis Obispo County boundary, 6.3 miles southwest of Maricopa, California.  The creek flows northwest to dissipate in the dry lake bed of Buena Vista Lake, 3.7 miles north of Pentland, Kern County, California.  In years of heavy rainfall it would be a tributary to Buena Vista Lake, which has been dry for many years due to agricultural diversion.

History
Arroyo de Amargosa was a stream that provided a camping and watering place on El Camino Viejo at its "sink" near Maricopa, southwest of Buena Vista Lake, between Arroyo San Emigdio to the southeast and Aguaje de La Brea 20 miles to the northwest near McKittrick, California.

References

El Camino Viejo
Rivers of Kern County, California
Rivers of San Luis Obispo County, California